Clode is a surname. Notable people with this surname include:

 Brent Clode (born 1963), New Zealand sprint canoer
 Danielle Clode, Australian author
 Harry Clode (1877–1964), English cricket player
 Mark Clode (born 1973), English football player
 Millie Clode (born 1982), English television presenter